Allu Ramalingaiah (1 October 1922 – 31 July 2004) was an Indian character actor, comedian, and producer known for his works in Telugu cinema. In 1990, He was honoured with the Padma Shri for his contribution to Indian cinema. In 1998, he received the Filmfare Lifetime Achievement Award - South, and the Raghupathi Venkaiah Award in 2001. Ramalingaiah appeared in over 1000 films in a variety of roles. The "Allu Ramalingaiah National Award" was instituted in his memory by the "Allu Ramalingaiah Academy of Arts". The award is presented every year to a Telugu film personality for life time achievement.

Early life
Ramalingaiah was born on October 1, 1922 in Palakollu, Andhra Pradesh, India into a Telugu speaking family.

Allu Ramalingaiah National Award recipients
Dasari Narayana Rao
K. Raghavendra Rao
Kota Srinivasa Rao
Trivikram Srinivas

Awards
 Raghupathi Venkaiah Award for the year 2001
 Padma Shri award by the Government of India for his outstanding contribution to Telugu cinema in the year 1990 
Filmfare Lifetime Achievement Award - South - 1998
Nandi Award for Akkineni Award for Best Home-viewing Feature Film - Dabbu Bhale Jabbu (1992)

Selected filmography

1950s

 Puttillu (1950)
 Parivartana (1954)
 Chakrapani (1954)
 Vaddante Dabbu (1954)
 Donga Ramudu (1955)
 Santanam (1955)
 Missamma (1955)
 Maya Bazaar (1957)
 Bhagya Rekha (1957)
 Todi Kodallu (1957)
 Pelli Naati Pramanalu (1958)
Aada Pettanam (1958)
 Appu Chesi Pappu Koodu (1958)
 Manchi Manasuku Manchi Rojulu (1958)
 Illarikam (1959)
 Krishna Leelalu (1959)

1960s

 Maa Babu (1960)
 Iddaru Mitrulu (1961)
 Bhakta Jayadeva (1961) 
 Gundamma Katha (1962)
 Swarna Manjari (1962)
 Siri Sampadalu (1962) as Appanna
 Narthanasala (1963)
 Sri Krishnarjuna Yudham (1963)
 Chaduvukunna Ammayilu (1963)
 Mooga Manasulu (1963)
 Dagudu Moothalu (1964)
 Naadi Aada Janme (1965)
 Mangamma Sapatham (1965)
 Aatma Gowravam (1965)
 Preminchi Choodu (1965)
 Pidugu Ramudu (1966)
 Paramanandayya Shishyula Katha (1966)
 Gopaludu Bhoopaludu (1967)
 Poola Rangadu (1967)
 Tikka Sankaraiah (1968)
 Ranabheri (1968)
 Deva Kanya (1968)
 Vintha Kapuram (1968)
 Buddhimanthudu (1969)
 Varakatnam (1969)
 Kathanayakudu (1969)
 Gandikota Rahasyam (1969) as Avadhani
 Bhale Rangadu (1969)
 Karpura Harathi (1969)

1970s

 Akka Chellelu (1970)
 Balaraju Katha (1970)
 Ali Baba 40 Dongalu (1970)
 Sambarala Rambabu (1970)
 Vinta Samsaram (1971)
 Talli Tandrulu (1970)
 Bomma Borusa (1971)
 Ramalayam (1971)
 Chinnanati Snehitulu (1971)
 Sisindri Chittibabu  (1971)
 Pavitra Hrudayalu (1971)
 Iddaru Ammayilu (1972)
 Tata Manavadu (1972)
 Kalam Marindi (1972)
 Nallathoru Kudumbam (1972)
 Vichitra Bandham (1972)
 Andala Ramudu (1973)
 Desoddharakulu (1973)
 Sharada (1973)
 Minor Babu (1973) as Bhupalayya
 Devudamma (1973)
 Vaade Veedu (1973)
 Banthrotu Bharya (1974)
 Chakravakam (1974)
 Moguda Pellama (1975)
 Babu (1975)
 Muthyala Muggu (1975)
 Ramarajyamlo Rakthapasam (1976)
 Bhakta Kannappa (1976)
 Manushulanta Okkate (1976)
 Secretary (1976)
 Bangaru Manishi (1976) as Bhajagovindam
 Shri Rajeshwari Vilas Coffee Club (1976)
 Pichi Maraju (1976) as Gopal Krishna
 Kalpana (1976)
 Savasagallu  (1977)
 Devathalara Deevinchandi (1977)
 Premalekhalu (1977)
 Yamagola (1977)
 Janma Janmala bandham (1977) as Venkatappayya
 Aalu Magalu (1977)
 Chiranjeevi Rambabu (1977) as Kanakaiah
 Lawyer Viswanath (1978) as Pakshiraju Seetaramaiah / Pakshi
 Manavoori Pandavulu (1978)
 Pottelu Punnamma (1978)
 Gorantha Deepam (1978)
 Sivaranjani (1978)
 Kumara Raja (1978)
 Kothala Raayudu (1979)
 Sankarabharanam (1979)
 Tayaramma Bangarayya (1979)
 Vetagadu (1979)
 Dongalaku Saval (1979)

1980s

 Maayadhaari Krishnudu (1980)
 Mosagadu (1980)
 Bhale Krishnudu (1980)
 Chandipriya (1980)
 Saptapadhi (1980)
 Mama Allulla Saval (1980) as Papaiah
 Sardar Papa Rayudu (1980)
 Sirimalle Navvindi (1980)
 Adrushtavanthudu (1980)
 Deeparadhana (1980) as Govindayya
 Kirayi Rowdylu (1981)
 Nyayam Kavali (1981)
 Prema Kanuka (1981)
 Thodu Dongalu (1981)
 Agni Poolu (1981)
 Taxi Driver (1981) as Lingaraju
 Kondaveeti Simham (1981)
 Mondi Ghatam (1982)
 Billa Ranga (1982)
 Idi Pellantara (1982)
 Subhalekha (1982)
 Bobbili Puli (1982)
 Justice Chowdary (1982)
 Golconda Abbulu (1982)
 Kalavari Samsaram (1982)
 Bangaru Koduku (1982) as Gurunatham
 Sangharshana (1983)
 Mantri Gari Viyyankudu (1983)
 Prema Pichollu (1983)
 Adavi Simhalu (1983)
 Mundadugu (1983)
 Rendu Jella Sita (1983)
 Bava Maradallu (1984)
 Hero (1984)
 Rustum (1984)
 Inti Guttu (1984)
 Mahanagaramlo Mayagadu (1984)
 Srimathi Kaavali (1984)
 Hero (1984)
 Goonda (1984)
 Bobbili Brahmanna (1984)
 Nayakulaku Saval (1984)
 Vijetha (1985)
 Tirugubatu (1985)
 Adavi Donga (1985)
 Oka Radha Iddaru Krishnulu (1985)
 Jwala (1985) as Pattabhi
 Donga (1985)
 Chattamtho Porattam (1985)
 Muchataga Mugguru (1985)
 Chantabbai (1986)
 Jayam Manade (1986) as Doubt Ramaswamy
 Nireekshana (1986)
 Ugra Narasimham (1986)
 Magadheerudu (1986)
 Kiraathakudu (1986)
 Ravana Brahma (1986)
 Kaliyuga Krishnudu (1986)
 Jailu Pakshi (1986)
 Dharmapatni (1987)
 Donga Mogudu (1987)
 Pasivadi Pranam (1987)
 Khaidi No.786 (1988)
 Yamudiki Mogudu (1988)
 Manchi Donga (1988)
 Aakhari Poratam (1988)
 Donga Ramudu (1988)
 State Rowdy (1989)
 Vijay (1989)
 Athaku Yamudu Ammayiki Mogudu (1989)
 Bala Gopaludu (1989)
 Chalaki Mogudu Chadastapu Pellam (1989)

1990s

 Nari Nari Naduma Murari  (1990)
 Raja Vikramarka (1990)
 Kodama Simham (1990)
 Jagadeka Veerudu Athiloka Sundari (1990)
 Kondaveeti Donga (1990)
 Rowdy Alludu (1991)
 Naa Pellam Naa Ishtam (1991)
 Gang Leader (1991)
 Killer (1991)
 Nirnayam (1991)
 Dabbu Bhale Jabbu (1992)
 Aapathbandavudu (1992)
 Chanti (1992)
 Aswamedham (1992)
 Peddarikam (1992)
 Muta Mesthri (1993)
 Aa Okkati Adakku (1993)
 Mechanic Alludu (1993)
 Bangaru Bullodu (1993) as Kannappa
 Mogudugaru (1993) as Kotilingam
 Parugo Parugu (1994)
 Bangaru Kutumbam (1994)
 Kadhalan (Tamil) (1994)
 S. P. Parasuram (1994)
 Maga Rayudu (1994)
 Premikudu (1995)
 Alluda Majaka (1995)
 Maavichiguru (1996)
 Devudu (1997)
 Choodalani Vundi (1998)

2000s

 Devullu (2000)
 Indra (2002)
 Premaku Swagatam (2002)
 Kalyana Ramudu (2003)
 Jai (2004)

References

External links

 

1922 births
2004 deaths
Indian male film actors
Telugu comedians
Nandi Award winners
Indian male stage actors
Recipients of the Padma Shri in arts
Film producers from Andhra Pradesh
Male actors from Andhra Pradesh
Telugu male actors
Indian independence activists
People from West Godavari district
Filmfare Awards South winners
21st-century Indian male actors
20th-century Indian male actors
Indian male comedians
People from Palakollu
20th-century comedians